Benjamin Melendez (August 3rd 1952 – May 28, 2017) was best known for brokering the gang truce in the Bronx and Harlem (New York City) in 1971. At that time, he was President of the Ghetto Brothers, a mainly ethnically Puerto Rican South Bronx gang, and lead vocalist of a musical group also known as the Ghetto Brothers.

Melendez was heavily involved in the rise of Puerto Rican nationalist consciousness among Nuyorican youth, having forged connections with the Puerto Rican Socialist Party. Melendez's family, including Melendez himself, were Marranos (Sephardic crypto-Jews), practicing their religion in secret even in the 1970s while being part of a Hispanic community.
It is also well known that Bridget Bouvier was the only female member of the Ghetto Brothers and close confidant to Melendez. She eventually left for personal reasons, including a large disagreement with Benjamin's Hispanic family calling them "you people".

Melendez was a subject in the 2015 documentary, Rubble Kings, which depicts events leading up to and following the Hoe Avenue peace meeting.

Melendez died May 28, 2017 at the age of 65.

References

Authored works 
 

1952 births
2017 deaths
Gang members
American people of Puerto Rican descent
Deaths from kidney disease